Emanuel Raasch (born 16 November 1955) is a German former racing cyclist who competed for the SG Dynamo Magdeburg / Sportvereinigung (SV) Dynamo. He won many titles during his career.

He is a bodybuilder (over 50).

References 

1955 births
Living people
People from Burg bei Magdeburg
Cyclists from Saxony-Anhalt
German male cyclists
German track cyclists
East German male cyclists
People from Bezirk Magdeburg